The Quabbin Valley is a region of Massachusetts in the United States. The region consists of the Quabbin Reservoir and accompanying river systems in Franklin, Hampden, Hampshire, and Worcester counties.  The area is sometimes known as the Swift River Valley region, a reference to the Swift River, which was dammed to form the reservoir.

Geography 
At its most restrictive, the Quabbin–Swift River Valley includes the towns immediately bordering the reservoir and lower length of the river. These towns include Belchertown, Hardwick, New Salem, Pelham, Petersham, Shutesbury, Palmer, and Ware.

The name Quabbin has also been adopted by regional partnerships bordering the reservoir but not including the entire valley. For example, the Central Quabbin Area Tourism Association consists of Petersham and Hardwick on the reservoir's eastern side, as well as Barre, Hubbardston, New Braintree, North Brookfield, Oakham, and Rutland, further east. The North Quabbin Community Coalition includes Petersham and New Salem bordering the reservoir, and the adjoining towns of Athol, Orange, Erving, Phillipston, Royalston, Warwick and Wendell. The north Qubbin Chamber of Commerce includes 11 towns: Athol, Barre,Erving,Hardwick,New Salem, Orange,Petersham, Phillipston, Royalston, Warwick and Wendell

Former towns 
Upon the construction of the Quabbin Reservoir, four towns in the valley were officially disincorporated, their area absorbed by surrounding municipalities. These towns are Dana, Enfield, Greenwich, and Prescott.

Many people living in those towns fought unsuccessfully to prevent construction of the reservoir, arguing that it was unfair to move the Swift River Valley inhabitants to provide drinking water for Boston residents, and the movement has become a part of Western Massachusetts folklore.

See also
Swift River Reservation

References

External links

 Friends of Quabbin
 North Quabbin Community Coalition
 Official Blog of The Quabbin Valley

Regions of Massachusetts
River valleys of the United States
Valleys of Massachusetts
Landforms of Franklin County, Massachusetts
Landforms of Hampden County, Massachusetts
Landforms of Hampshire County, Massachusetts
Landforms of Worcester County, Massachusetts